The Cactus Range is a small mountain range in Nye County, Nevada. The range lies southwest of Cactus Flat and north of Pahute Mesa. The range lies within the restricted area of the Tonopah Test Range.

Named peaks in the range include:
Antelope Peak  at 
Cactus Peak  at 
Urania Peak  at 
Mount Helen  at 

Cactus Range was so named on account of cacti in the area.

References 

Mountain ranges of Nevada
Mountain ranges of Nye County, Nevada
Mountain ranges of the Great Basin